Land of the Giants is a one-hour American science fiction television series that aired on ABC for two seasons, beginning on September 22, 1968, and ending on March 22, 1970. The show was created and produced by Irwin Allen. Land of the Giants was Allen's fourth science-fiction TV series. The show was and released by 20th Century Fox Television. The series was filmed entirely in color and ran for 51 episodes. The show starred Gary Conway and special guest star Kurt Kasznar.

Five novels based on the television series, including three written by acclaimed science-fiction author Murray Leinster, were published in 1968 and 1969.

Series overview

Set in 1983 (at that time, 15 years in the future), the series tells the tale of the crew and passengers of a suborbital transport ship named Spindrift. In the pilot episode, the Spindrift is en route from Los Angeles to London, on an ultra-fast suborbital flight. Just beyond Earth's boundary with space, the Spindrift encounters a magnetic space storm, and is dragged through a space warp to a mysterious planet where everything is 12 times larger than on Earth, whose inhabitants the Earthlings nickname "the Giants". The Spindrift crash-lands, and the damage renders it inoperable.

Very little is known about the home planet of the Giants. This is partially because the Spindrift crew very seldom leaves the area where their spaceship crashed in the opening episode. Only two other (unidentified) giant societies are ever seen, in the episodes "The Land of the Lost" and "The Secret City of Limbo".

No name is ever established for the mysterious planet, but the inhabitants know of Earth, Venus, and Mars, referring to them by name in one episode. Exactly where the planet is located is also never made clear. In the episode "On a Clear Night You Can See Earth", Captain Steve Burton (Gary Conway) claims to have seen Earth through a set of infrared goggles invented by the giants, implying that the two planets are near enough to see one from the other. The only established method by which Earth people may reach the giants' planet is high-altitude flight, passing through what one giant calls a "dimension lock".

Although various episodes establish that at least six other flights have landed on the planet, no episode confirms anyone ever returning to Earth. The first mention of other visitors from Earth was in episode two, "Ghost Town", in which another ship was said to have crashed long ago without any survivors. In episode four, "Underground", another Earth ship is described as crashing three years previously, again with no survivors.

Several episodes show crews surviving their initial crashes, only to be killed later. The episode "Brainwash" has a crew of little people surviving long enough to build a radio station that can communicate with Earth. They are killed shortly after that. The episodes "Golden Cage" and "The Lost Ones" show a few survivors from other crashes. Only the Spindrift crew seems to have survived for long with its party intact.

One continent, or hemisphere, is dominated by an authoritarian government that tolerates full freedoms within a capitalist system, but it does not tolerate any effort to effect political change. Exactly what the political situation is on other continents is not known, although at least one overseas land has a despotic ruler. The air traffic control tells those who venture out to sea that they should turn back, that nothing beyond that sea has been explored nor is there current contact; whether this is an official government line or the truth is not known.

Culturally, the Giant society closely resembles the contemporary United States of 1968 (in various episodes, it has a police force, private hospitals, prisons, a state governor, radio and television services, a zoo, jazz clubs, and even a racetrack; the Giants speak English, drive American cars, attend vaudeville-style theatres, and play chess). The Earth people find themselves able to cope, and their efforts to get around are facilitated by the ubiquity of large drains leading directly from interior rooms to the pavement, in an outside wall of most buildings. The Giant government has offered a reward for the capture of the small Earth people (whom the Giants call "the little people").

In spite of the authoritarianism, several dissident movements are at work that either help other dissenters (such as the Earth people) or are actively working to unseat the ruling party. The government has established a special-investigations department (SID) to deal with assorted dissidents, but it also takes the lead in dealing with the Earth people. For an extended period from the middle of the first season to the middle of the second, the primary local SID officer is Inspector Kobick.

The Giant technologies mostly resemble mid-20th century Earth, but inconsistently: Some are significantly more advanced in some episodes (e.g. cloning, cybernetics, force fields, magnetic stunners, androids, and teleporters) and are slightly behind in others (no microelectronics, hearing aids, or crewed space flight).

The little people's objectives are survival, by obtaining food and avoiding capture by the Giants or attacks from animals, such as cats and dogs, and repair of their spacecraft, so they can attempt to return to Earth. They largely manage to survive by the help of sympathizers and stealth, making the most of their small size, plus their ingenuity in using their technology where it is superior to that of the Giants.

They do not achieve the second objective, as the primary systems of the craft are severely damaged, although in some episodes (including "The Flight Plan") Burton implies that only a lack of fuel prevents the ship from lifting off. The secondary systems are insufficient to enable them to achieve the suborbital flight required. They are unable to use Giant technology, as it is bulky and less advanced; in one episode, an experimental nuclear reactor, provided by an engineering student, produces dangerous side effects and is prone to overloading. They also cannot trust the Giants, who in another episode ("Target: Earth") offer the little people a ride home in exchange for technical assistance with their space program, but then double-cross them.

They are aided in their first objective, and at least somewhat hindered in the second, by the leadership of Captain Burton. He behaves as a leader and as protector to the passengers and crew, and his leadership has rescued them from some difficulties.  Burton, though, also tries to keep the Giants from ever reaching Earth. In the episode "Brainwash", Giant police officer Ashim (Warren Stevens) says, "Maybe we can find the home planet of these little people. It may be a very tiny world, but rich beyond our dreams." In several episodes, Burton puts keeping the Giants away from Earth above the need to get his people home. At the end of those episodes, he destroys devices that would get the Spindrift back to Earth, but which would probably enable the Giants to journey there, too.

In several episodes, the Giants capture one of the passengers or crew, and the rest have to rescue them. The Earth people avoid capture most of the time, because their spaceship is hidden in a wood (in several episodes, described by the Giants as a park) outside the city limits. They also occasionally form alliances with individual Giants for some common beneficial purpose.

The show had no proper conclusion about the humans' attempts to return to Earth. The final episode, "Graveyard of Fools", was a universal tale that could have taken place any time in the second season. The penultimate episode, "Wild Journey" (guest-starring Bruce Dern), has Steve and Dan using alien technology to travel back in time to Earth just a few hours before their ill-fated flight. In a storyline lifted from the Lost in Space episode "The Time Merchant", they attempt to alter the timeline, but succeed only in ensuring that the events of the first episode, "The Crash", take place (footage from the pilot, where Spindrift becomes lost, is included in this episode), creating a Twilight Zone-style twist ending, with the impression of a recurring cycle of inevitable events.

The first season comprised a regular 26 episodes, but season two was left one episode short. The show thus comprises only 51 episodes (or 52 episodes including the unaired pilot).

Episodes

Cast
Gary Conway as Captain Steve Burton
Don Matheson as Mark Wilson
Stefan Arngrim as Barry Lockridge
Don Marshall as Dan Erickson
Deanna Lund as Valerie Scott
Heather Young as Betty Hamilton
Kurt Kasznar as Alexander Fitzhugh
Kevin Hagen as Inspector Kobick (recurring character)

Land of the Giants guest stars included many familiar faces from other 1950s and 1960s sci-fi/fantasy and adventure series, including Jack Albertson, Michael Ansara, John Carradine, Yvonne Craig, Charles Drake, Alan Hale Jr, Jonathan Harris, Lee Meriwether, Larry Pennell, Warren Stevens, and Ron Howard.

Production

The show was created by Irwin Allen. With a budget of US$250,000 per episode, Land of the Giants set a new record. The actors had to be physically fit, as they had to do many stunts, such as climbing giant curbs, phone cords, and ropes. Don Marshall, who played the part of Dan Ericson, credited his previous football, track, and pole-vaulting work for helping him with the stunts required.

Elements of Allen's Lost in Space series recur in Land of the Giants, notably the relationship between foolish, greedy, on-the-run bank robber Alexander B. Fitzhugh (Kurt Kasznar) and the young boy Barry Lockridge (Stefan Arngrim), paralleling the relationship on Lost in Space between Doctor Smith and the young Will Robinson. Also, for main-cast billing, Kasznar was treated contractually in the same manner as Jonathan Harris had been on Lost in Space -billed in last place on the opening credit sequence, but billed as "Special Guest Star" (though he was a series regular). Apart from this, Gary Conway received solo star billing in the opening credits, with the other regulars all receiving "also starring" billing.

The show was originally intended to premiere as a midseason replacement in the spring of 1968, and the first 12 episodes were shot in the fall of 1967. This was changed and Giants premiered in September 1968 for a full season. The network screened the episodes in a significantly different order from the production sequence. This caused disconcerting lapses in continuity, since in the first 12 episodes filmed (but not in later episodes) the Giants moved slowly and hardly spoke. For example, "Ghost Town" was the 14th episode filmed (i.e. was not one of the original 12 episodes), but was the second episode aired.

The cost of production was immense, partly because of the special optical effects needed to matte the little people into shots also showing the giants, and partly because of the gigantic mechanical props needed, for the little people to interact with, in shots depicting the giant-sized world in which they find themselves, and the futuristic spacecraft sets that were needed to represent the Spindrift. Because of the enormous cost,  filming episodes in pairs using the same sets was more efficient and cost-effective, so writers were informed about what giant-sized props were available, which they could incorporate into their storylines. These episodes were filmed back-to-back.

To save on production costs, Allen was not above using the same device he had employed on The Time Tunnel – reusing stock footage from 20th Century Fox's film library. For instance, in the episode "Collector's Item", footage of Wayne Manor from Batman is recycled as the luxury mansion home of a rich giant.

In the unaired pilot of The Crash, no end scene has the giant dog in the garbage dump. Once receiving confirmation that Land of the Giants had been picked up by the network, the pilot was reworked, and production began on succeeding episodes. A break in production, though, occurred after 12 episodes were in the can (enough for a short run as a midseason replacement), until the show received the green light on the decision to launch it as a full season the following fall.

Music
Like Allen's previous series Lost in Space and The Time Tunnel, the theme music was composed by John Williams. As with Lost in Space, Williams composed two different themes (in this case one for each season). Williams also scored the pilot episode "The Crash", and was the third composer to be attached to the project – Williams' work replaced a rejected score and theme by Alexander Courage; Joseph Mullendore composed a second theme that was also thrown out. Mullendore later scored five episodes and Courage did one, with other episodes scored by Richard LaSalle (seven episodes), Leith Stevens (five), Harry Geller (four), Irving Gertz, Paul Sawtell, and Robert Prince (one each).

Soundtrack
GNP Crescendo released an album as part of The Fantasy Worlds Of Irwin Allen, featuring both themes, Williams' replacement score (tracks 2–6) and Courage's thrown-out score (tracks 9 and 10) for "The Crash".
 Land Of The Giants Main Title – Season 1 (1:02)
 Off Course/The Landing/Dense Fog (6:01)
 Giant Eyes/Hidden Gun/The Big Cat/Bug Box (8:45)
 Fitzhugh's Gun/Hiding Place (6:57)
 Giants Probing/The Rescue (3:35) (note: most copies are actually missing most of Giants Probing)
 Water Drain/More Garbage (2:44)
 Land Of The Giants End Title – Season 1 (:31)
 Land Of The Giants Main Title – Season 2 (1:01)
 Space Storm/Through The Thing/Crash Landing/Giant Ford (6:08)
 The Sniveling Sneak (6:45)
 Land Of The Giants End Title – Season 2 (:30)
LaLaLand Records subsequently released "Land of the Giants - 50th Anniversary Soundtrack Collection: Limited Edition, a deluxe 4-CD box set of original music from the classic Irwin Allen '60s sci-fi/fantasy television series!". Highly recommended.  Music by "John Williams, Alexander Courage, Leith Stevens, Harry Geller, Artie Kane, Joseph Mullendore, Richard LaSalle, Robert Prince, Irving Gertz, and Paul Sawtell."

Home media
All 51 episodes were released on DVD in Region 1 in a limited-edition 9-disc Complete Series on July 24, 2007, from 20th Century Fox Home Entertainment. This includes the unaired original pilot, which has some differences (extra scenes, but not others later added to the aired version) and score music familiar to Lost in Space fans and interviews with cast members.

In Region 2, Revelation Films has released the entire series on DVD in the UK. Season one was released on March 28, 2011, and season two on June 13, 2011. They also released a complete series set on March 12, 2012.

In Region 4, Madman Entertainment released season one on DVD in Australia on August 20, 2014. They released season two on November 12, 2014.

Merchandise and licensing
The pilot episode was the subject of a View-Master reel and booklet set in 1968 (GAF Packet # B494). One notable difference between the aired episode and the reel set is an image of the Spindrift flying through the giant forest in apparent daylight. In the aired episode, the Spindrift arrives on the Giants' planet during the night, and its flight through the forest also occurs that same night. Though the following is unconfirmed, either the daylight shot was a special-effects sequence cut from the aired pilot, or a special setup for the View Master photographers.

In 1968, Pyramid Books published an extended novel adaptation of the pilot (Land of the Giants, Pyramid Books, X-1846), written by famed author Murray Leinster. Among notable changes or inventions is that the Spindrift is still an operational, flying ship after the initial crash, with enough "atomic power" to last as much as several months. Another invention for the novel is the knowledge that two other ships, the Anne and Marintha, disappeared by the same mysterious phenomenon that sends the Spindrift to the Giants' planet. The Spindrift castaways encounter a female survivor of the Anne, named Marjorie, who joins the castaways in this novel. Although the television series featured three episodes with other on-screen survivors from previously lost Earth flights, the novel's character Marjorie and the ships Anne and Marintha do not appear and are not mentioned in the series.

Two further novels were penned by Leinster — The Hot Spot and Unknown Danger (Pyramid, 1969). The first two Leinster books were reprinted in 1969 in the United Kingdom by World Distributors, the eponymous novel retitled The Trap. Unknown Danger was not published in the UK, but World Distributors also published two United Kingdom-only novels the same year, Slingshot for a David and The Mean City; both were credited to James Bradwell, a pseudonym for Arthur William Charles Kent.

A hardback novel for children, Flight of Fear by Carl Henry Rathjen (1969), was published in the United States by Whitman.

Also in 1968, Gold Key Comics published a comic-book version of Land of the Giants, which ran to five issues. In 2010, all five issues were reprinted together as a hardcover book by Hermes Press.

In 1968, Aurora Plastics Corporation produced two plastic model kits based on the series: Land of the Giants was the title of a diorama depicting a giant snake attacking characters Steve Burton, Betty Hamilton, and Dan Erickson, who uses a giant safety pin as a spear. The second kit was a model of the Spindrift, released as Land of the Giants Space Ship, instead of using the proper name for the vehicle.

In 1975, Aurora reissued the kit (now renamed Rocket Transport Spindrift), with new box art and photos of the assembled kit. It had a front, top section that could be lifted off, revealing a full interior that had to be constructed by the builder, as well as a working door. Most of the model kit was molded in the same bright red-orange as the ship itself, while the interior was molded in a light green, which could be painted.

In 1969, Aladdin Industries released a metal, embossed lunch box based on the series. The artist, Elmer Lenhardt, used his own likeness for a giant scientist taunting the little people. A reproduction of the lunch box was later released by Fab Gear USA in a limited edition of 5000.

Deanna Lund (Valerie Scott) co-wrote a series of short stories based on the series, under the collective title "Valerie in Giant Land".

MeTV began airing Land of the Giants in September 2016 to complement its Saturday-night sci-fi line-up of other Irwin Allen series: Voyage to the Bottom of the Sea, Lost in Space, and The Time Tunnel. Prior to debuting on MeTV, Land of the Giants had aired only sporadically in syndication in recent years. The Horror Channel in the UK aired the series in full from September 19, 2016, showing one episode a day on weekdays, for 10 weeks.

References

External links

American Broadcasting Company original programming
English-language television shows
Fiction about giants
Television series about size change
Television series by 20th Century Fox Television
Television series by Irwin Allen Television Productions
Television series created by Irwin Allen
Television series set in the future
Television series set on fictional planets
1960s American science fiction television series
1968 American television series debuts
1970 American television series endings
1970s American science fiction television series
Television series set in 1983